Bamboo Airways JSC, operating as Bamboo Airways, is a Vietnamese airline owned by the FLC Group, registered in Quy Nhơn, Vietnam, with a head office in Cầu Giấy District, Hanoi. Founded in 2017, the airline launched operations on 16 January 2019, declared that it would follow the "hybrid airline" model. It operates a mixed fleet of narrowbody and widebody aircraft, and has hubs at Noi Bai International Airport and Tan Son Nhat International Airport.

History

Launching & aircraft acquisition
The airline was founded in 2017. In March 2018, a memorandum of understanding with Airbus for up to 24 Airbus A321neos in a deal worth up to US$3.1 billion was signed; the event was witnessed by the General Secretary Nguyễn Phú Trọng and the French Parliamentary President François de Rugy. On 25 June 2018, with the presence of Deputy Prime Minister Vương Đình Huệ, the FLC Group officially signed an agreement with Boeing for an order of 20 new Boeing 787-9 Dreamliner aircraft worth $5.6 billion.

In March 2019, Bamboo Airways completed an agreement to buy 26 more Airbus A321Neo aircraft with a total listing value of up to $6.3 billion, serving the plan to develop the fleet and open new international routes, the agreement will bring the total number of narrow-body Airbus A321Neo aircraft ordered by Bamboo Airways to 50, including 24 in the memorandum of understanding signed in March 2018.

The airline aimed to hire up to 600 personnel when it began in April 2018, and additionally had goals to operate as a five-star airline. In July 2018, The FLC Group announced it would be increasing its charter capital to $56.52 million.

The establishment of the carrier was approved by the Prime Minister of Vietnam in July 2018. The airline's AOC was granted on 9 July 2018, and Bamboo Airways subsequently passed the five stages for certification required by Vietnam's Civil Aviation Authority. After reviewing the airline's financial structure and business plan, the Ministry of Transport issued an aviation license in November 2018. The carrier inducted its first aircraft, an Airbus A319-100, in December 2018. The same month, Bamboo Airways took delivery of its first A321neo, on lease from GECAS. 

The airline started operations using aircraft acquired by lease from third party lessors, before taking delivery of aircraft from Airbus. Operations started on 16 January 2019, with a leased Airbus A320 linking Ho Chi Minh City with Hanoi. A firm order covering ten Boeing 787-9s was made public in early 2019. The carrier received its first A320neo in November 2019. The airline's first Boeing 787-9 was delivered a month later.

Founders' crisis, restructuring and new owner
In March 2022, Trịnh Văn Quyết - the founder and chairman of Bamboo Airways its parent group FLC - as well as many other FLC's key people were arrested over alleged market manipulation, fraud and appropriation of properties. Concerned that the crisis will negatively affect the operations of the carrier and damage the rights and safety of the customers, the Civil Aviation Authority of Vietnam announced that it will closely monitor and supervise Bamboo Airways in a certain period of time, while Bamboo Airways declared that it faced little disruption and its business was still running "smoothly".

Followed by the authorities' investigations aiming at its parent company FLC Group, Bamboo Airways stated that it was needing a "strategic investor". Local media has reported that a new owner, that its accurate identity is yet to be confirmed, has already started its acquisition of Bamboo Airways by refreshing the board of directors of the enterprise, announcing restructure plans for Bamboo Airways as well as cutting connections between Bamboo Airways's operations and its "former" owner FLC Group.

As of December 2022, the official website of Bamboo Airways has no more mentioned the names of its founders, including the "FLC Group" brand. In the financial report of 2022's third quarter, FLC has formally confirmed that its stake in Bamboo has been reduced to just more than 21%, eventually losing its dominant stakeholder position.

In March 2023, Bamboo Airways has confirmed that it has found a group of new investors replacing Trịnh Văn Quyết and FLC's ownership in the company. Meanwhile, the first Bamboo aircraft was rolled out in Taiwan without "FLC Group" marking.

Corporate affairs

Key people
, Duong Thi Mai Hoa held the vice-president and general manager positions. Dang Tat Thang held the CEO position from 2018 until July 2022. Nguyen Manh Quan is the current CEO of the carrier, as of July 30, 2022.

Dang Tat Thang was also the Chairman of the carrier after the former Chairman Trinh Van Quyet was arrested at the end of March 2022 on stock manipulation charges. He held the position and also the aforementioned CEO position until July 27, 2022 when he resigned, citing "personal reasons".. After an extraordinary shareholders meeting on August 13, 2022, the carrier's shareholders has appointed Deputy Chairman Nguyen Ngoc Trong as the new Chairman of the Board for the carrier.

Ownership
Bamboo Airways was owned by FLC Group, a company that specializes property development, finance, and mining, among other activities. FLC Group is reportedly transferring Bamboo Airways to another "strategic investor" and eventually withdrawing its influence from the carrier.

Headquarters
Bamboo Airways is headquartered in Cau Giay district, Hanoi.

Destinations

, Bamboo Airways operates or has operated to the following destinations:

Fleet

Current fleet 

, Bamboo Airways operates the following aircraft:

According to the Chairman Nguyen Ngoc Trong, Bamboo Airways is aiming to boost the number of aircraft in the fleet to 35 by the end of 2022, 42 in 2023 and 100 in 2028.

Retired fleet 
Those types of aircraft were either retired or decommissioned from Bamboo Airways fleet:

See also
Transport in Vietnam

References 

Airlines of Vietnam
Vietnamese brands
Airlines established in 2017
Vietnamese companies established in 2017